Student Choice High School is a Public Charter High School located in Tempe, Arizona. Established in 2000, the school serves at-risk students and prepares them for life after earning a high school diploma.

History
Student Choice High School opened in fall 2000.

The school is accredited by the North Central Association of Colleges and Schools.

References

External links
 Student Choice High School

Charter schools in Arizona
Education in Tempe, Arizona
Educational institutions established in 2000
Public high schools in Arizona
Schools in Maricopa County, Arizona
2000 establishments in Arizona